John Ward Spear (1848 – 27 April 1921) was a British Liberal Unionist and later Conservative politician.

He was elected at the 1900 general election as Member of Parliament (MP) for the Tavistock division of Devon, with a majority of only 15 votes. He was defeated in 1906 by his Liberal Party predecessor Hugh Luttrell, but cut Luttrell's majority in January 1910 and defeated him at the December 1910 general election. He did not contest the 1918 general election, and retired from Parliament.

References

External links 
 

1848 births
1921 deaths
Conservative Party (UK) MPs for English constituencies
Liberal Unionist Party MPs for English constituencies
UK MPs 1900–1906
UK MPs 1910–1918
Members of the Parliament of the United Kingdom for Tavistock